Abidine Sakande (born 22 September 1994) is an English cricketer who played for Sussex County Cricket Club. He is a right-arm medium bowler who also bats right-handed.

Sakande was born in Chester to a father who had immigrated from Burkina Faso. He was educated at Ardingly College and St John's College, Oxford. Sakande made his first-class debut for Oxford University Cricket Club in the University Match in 2014. He spent the 2016–17 off-season playing club cricket in New Zealand.

Sakande declined Sussex's offer of a contract extension in 2019, and left the club at the end of the season.

He now plays for Leicestershire.

References

External links
 
 

1994 births
Living people
People educated at Ardingly College
Alumni of St John's College, Oxford
English cricketers
Oxford University cricketers
Sussex cricketers
English people of Burkinabé descent
Sportspeople of Burkinabé descent
Sportspeople from Chester
Oxfordshire cricketers
Oxford MCCU cricketers
Leicestershire cricketers